Michael Louis Friendly (born 1945) is an American-Canadian psychologist, Professor of Psychology at York University in Ontario, Canada, and director of its Statistical Consulting Service, especially known for his contributions to graphical methods for categorical and multivariate data, and on the history of data and information visualisation.

Biography 
Born in New York City, Friendly obtained his BS in 1966 from the Rensselaer Polytechnic Institute, and his MS in 1969 from Princeton University. In 1971/2 he also obtained his PhD in psychology at Princeton under supervision of Harold Gulliksen and Peter Ornstein, with the thesis titled "Proximity Analysis and the Structure of Organization in Free Recall."

Friendly's first research project in the field of psychometrics and cognitive psychology had started at the Educational Testing Service and Princeton University, and was made possible by a Psychometric Fellowship awarded by the Educational Testing Service. After graduation Friendly jointed the Department of Psychology at the York University in Ontario, Canada, where he continued his research. At the York University he was appointed Associate Professor and later on Professor of Psychology, and since 1985 also director of its Statistical Consulting Service.

Friendly is Associate Editor of the Journal of Computational and Graphical Statistics and an Editor of Statistical Science.
In 2018 he became a Fellow of the American Statistical Association.

Work 
Friendly's research interests have developed over years. It started in the 1970s with the application of quantitative and computer methods to problems in cognitive psychology, including the cognitive aspects of extracting information from graphical displays. In the 1990s Friendly started focussing on the history of statistics and data visualization, and furthermore graphical methods for data and information visualization.

Publications

Books 
 
 
 
 
 Support web site

Selected articles and reports 
 1991. "Interpreting higher order interactions in loglinear analysis: A picture is worth 1000 words". With John Fox. Tech. rep., Institute for Social Research, York University, Toronto, CA.
 1992. "Graphical methods for categorical data". In: Proceedings of the SAS User's Group International Conference, 17:1367-1373.
 1994. "A fourfold display for 2 by 2 by K tables". Tech. Rep. 217, York University, Psychology Dept.
 1994. "Mosaic displays for multi-way contingency tables". In: Journal of the American Statistical Association, 89:190-200.
 2000. "A brief history of the mosaic display." Journal of Computational and Graphical Statistics. 11(1):89-107. URL
 2000. "The roots and branches of statistical graphics". With Dan Denis. In: Journal de la Société Française de Statistique, 141(4):51-60. (published in 2001).
 2001/2008. "Milestones in the history of thematic cartography, statistical graphics, and data visualization", URL www.datavis.ca/milestones 32 (2001): 13. .
 2007. "A brief history of data visualization". In: C. Chen, Wolfgang Härdle and Antony Unwin, eds., Handbook of Computational Statistics: Data Visualization, vol. III, chap. 1, pp. 1–34. Heidelberg: Springer-Verlag.
 2007. "Visualizing nature and society". With Gilles Palsky. In: James R. Akerman and Robert W. Karrow, eds., Maps: Finding Our Place in the World, pp. 205–251. Chicago, IL: University of Chicago Press.
 2007. "HE plots for Multivariate General Linear Models." Journal of Computational and Graphical Statistics, 16, 421–444.

References

External links 

 Milestones in the History of Thematic Cartography, Statistical Graphics, and Data Visualization: An illustrated chronology of innovations by Michael Friendly and Daniel J. Denis.
 The Past, Present and Future of Statistical Graphics a 2004 presentation by Michael Friendly on VIEWS, London, Nov, 2004.
 Carme 2011 - Advances in visualizing categorical data - Michael Friendly a 2011 presentation by Michael Friendly at Carme 2011

1945 births
Living people
21st-century American psychologists
Information visualization experts
Rensselaer Polytechnic Institute alumni
Princeton University alumni
Academic staff of York University
Fellows of the American Statistical Association
20th-century American psychologists
Quantitative psychologists